Joe Whalen (1916–1992) was an American tennis player in the 1930s who won a number of championships; he was originally from Millinocket, Maine, but grew up in Miami, Florida.

His most significant championship win was the 1936 United States Pro Championship. He beat Charles Wood in the final.

During World War II he served in the U.S. Army and was awarded the Purple Heart. Afterwards, he promoted professional tennis, and served as a teaching pro at a number of clubs. He founded and ran a tennis court construction company in Jacksonville, Florida until his retirement.

See also
 Professional Tennis Championships

External links
 Whalen Tennis
 Joe Whalen
 History of the Pro Tennis Wars
 Chapter VII: Awaiting Perry, 1936

References

1916 births
1992 deaths
American male tennis players
United States Army personnel of World War II
People from Millinocket, Maine
Sportspeople from Maine
Tennis players from Miami
United States Army soldiers
Professional tennis players before the Open Era